Dimitri Papadimos (1 May 1918 - 3 May 1994) was a Greek photographer.

Early life 

Papadimos was born in Cairo, Egypt of Greek parents in 1918.  His father was from mainland Greece, Pelion, and his mother from the Greek island of Imbros At a young age, Papadimos lost both his parents.

Career 

Dimitri Papadimos met the British architect Austen St. Barbe Harrison, in Cairo in the late 1930s . In 1939, Austen Harrison sent Papadimos to study cinematography in Paris but the outbreak of World War II put an early end to his studies.  During WWII, Papadimos served as "War Photographer" for the Greek Forces that fought by the side of the Allies. Throughout his professional career he met many European writers, including Robin Maugham, Patrick Balfour, 3rd Baron Kinross, A. W. Lawrence, Philip Sherrard, Francis Noel-Baker and Arab intellectuals such as Hassan Fathy; and was the contributing photographer to many of their works (see Books with photographs by Dimitri Papadimos).

 

Papadimos' photographs illustrated many magazines and books of travel literature, including Business & Finance, Tourism in Greece, Harper's Bazaar, La Famme Nouvelle, Loisirs, News of the World and Parade. At the same time, he presented his work in exhibitions, 1949-"Life and Landscape in the Middle East" British Institute, Cairo, 1950-"XIIeme Salon National de Photographie", Palais Khedive Ismail, Societe des Amis de l'Art, 1952-"Exposition Mondiale de la Photographie" Luzern Suisse mainly in Cairo and Athens. He moved to Athens in 1956. He traveled throughout Greece, from Thrace to Crete, photographing the land extensively. In 1974, the publishing house "Olkos" published his album Greece: A vanishing culture. In 1981 the second edition of his album appeared, published by the publishing house "Nea Synora". He collaborated with the Museum of Greek Folk Art and the Hellenic Tourism Organization (EOT). He became connected with many artists, including Lawrence Durrell, Jean Cocteau, Austen St. Barbe Harrison, Patrick Leigh Fermor, Melina Mercouri, Robin Maugham, and Philip Sherrard photographing them and their work. He worked in the production of motion pictures, both Greek and foreign such as Jules Dassin, a 1957 French film, He Who Must Die, Phaedra, Carl Forman's The Guns of Navarone and Lawrence Durrell's film The Spirit of Place, a BBC documentary about Egypt. He lived the last years of his life, from 1986 to his death, on the island of Spetses. Papadimos died in Athens in 1994, aged 76.

Dimitri Papadimos Archive 

The "Dimitri Papadimos archive" was donated to European League of Institutes of the Arts (ELIA)- The Hellenic Literary and Historical Archive, part of the  National Bank of Greece Cultural Foundation (MIET) during the autumn of 1994, a few months after his death. The donation was made by his widow, Liana Papadimou and his son Ioannis D.Papadimos (Yani), according to his wishes.

Portraits by Papadimos

Books with photographs by Papadimos 
Robin Maugham. "Journey to Siwa", London, Chapman and Hall, 1950.
Patrick Balfour, "The Orphaned Realm. Journeys in Cyprus", London, Percival Marshall, 1951.
Lord Kinross (Patrick Balfour)/Dimitri, "Portrait of Greece", London, Max Parrish, 1956.
Lawrence, A.W./Dimitri Papadimos (Contributing Photographer), "Greek Architecture", Middlesex, Penguin Books, 1957.
Philip Sherrard/Dimitri (photographs), "The Pursuit of Greece", London, John Murray, 1964.
Philip sherrard/Dimitri (photographs), "The Pursuit of Greece", Athens, Denise Harvey & Company, 1987.
"Marathon", photos by Dimitri, Athens, Bible Travel Service, 1963.
 John Campbell, K., "Honour, Family and Patronage: A Study of Institutions and Moral Values in Greek Mountain Community", Oxford, Clarendon Press, 1964.
Ντίνος Κονόμος, "Στο Μουσείο Λαϊκής Τέχνης, Ναοί και μονές στην Ζάκυνθο", Αθήνα, εκδόσεις Ιονικής και Λαίκής Τραπέζης Ελλάδος, 1964.
Lord Kinross (Patrick Balfour)/Dimitri (Contributing photographer), "Portrait of Egypt", London, Andre Deutsch Ltd, 1966.
Kevin Andrews/Dimitri(Contributing photographer), "Cities of the World", Athens, London, Phoenix House, 1967.
Ιωάννης Τραυλός, "Νεοκλασσική Αρχιτεκτονική στην Ελλάδα", Αθήνα, Εμπορική Τράπεζα της Ελλάδος, 1967.
Edward Noel-Baker|"Looking at Greece", Philadelphia/New York, J.B.Lippincott Company.
John Campbell K. / Philip Sherrard / Dimitri(Photography by), "Modern Greece", London/New York, Praeger, 1968. Ernest Benn Ltd, 1968.Clarendon Press/Oxford University Press, 1974 
Σπύρος Βασιλείου, "Φώτα και σκιές", Αθήνα, S.Bontas, 1969.
Hassan Fathy / Dimitri Papadimos (Photographs), "Gourna: A Tale of Two Villages", Cairo, Ministry of Culture, 1969.1989
Hassan Fathy, "Construire avec le peuple", Paris, Jerome Martineau, 1970.Original from	the University of Michigan Digitized 8 May 2007
Hassan Fathy, "Architecture for the Poor", Chicago, London, The University of Chicago Press, 1973.
Δημήτρης Παπαδήμος, "Η Ελλάδα που φεύγει", Αθήνα, Ολκός, 1974.
Δημήτρης Παπαδήμος, "Η Ελλάδα που φεύγει", Αθήνα, Νέα Σύνορα/Λιβάνης, 1981.
Δημήτρης Παπαδήμος, "Σπέτσες", έκδοση Τουριστικού Ομίλου Σπετσών, 1980.
Εμμανουήλ Κάσδαγλης / Δημήτρης (φωτογραφίες), "Το αγλαότεχνο τυπογραφείο των αδελφών Ταρουσόπουλου", Αθήνα, ΄Αγρα, 1980.
James Steel, "The Hassan Fathy Collection, a Catalogue of Visual Documents at the Aga Khan Award for Architecture", Bern, Aga Khan Trust of Culture, 1989.
Ian MacNiven, "Lawrence Durrell, A Biography", London, Faber and Faber Ltd, 1998. 
Μαρία Στασινοπούλου, "Χρονολόγιο Εργογραφίας Γεώργου Σεφέρη (1900-1971)", Αθήνα, Μεταίχμιο, 2000.
Ahmed Youssef, "Cocteau l'Egyptien", editions du Rocher/Jean Paul Bertrand, 2001.
Κωστής Λιόντης (επιμ.), "Ο Φωτογράφος Δημήτρης Παπαδήμος", Επτά Ημέρες-Η Καθημερινή, 14.10.2001.
"Η Ελλάδα στήν Ευρωπαϊκή Ένωση, 20 χρόνια συμμετοχής", Ευρωπαϊκή επιτροπή στήν Ελλάδα, Αθήνα, ΕΛΙΑ, 2001.
Richard Clogg (επιμ.), "Bearing Gifts, Humanitarian Aide to Greece in 1940s", St.Anthony's College Oxford, Palgrave Macmillan, 2008.
"Ethnographes et voyageurs, les defies de l'ecriture", Paris, Editions du comite des traveux historiques et scientifiques, 2008.
Δημήτρης Παπαδήμος, "Αγιος Νικόλαος, τοποι και άνθρωποι στη δεκαετία του '60", Δήμος Αγίου Νικολάου Κρήτης, Ίδρυμα Γ&Α Μαμιδάκη, 2008.
"Ιστορία του Ελληνικού Έθνους", 4π Ειδικές Εκδόσεις National Geographic, 2010.
"Λαϊκό τραγούδι:η αυθεντική ιστορία", 4π Ειδικές Εκδόσεις National Geographic, 2010.

References

External links 
Official Site of "Dimitri Papadimos"
Photos by Dimitri Papadimos
Egyptian Moments By LAWRENCE DURRELL, an account of Lawrence Durrell's film "The Spirit of Place", a BBC documentary about for Egypt.
Durrell's film "The spirit of place", a BBC documentary about Egypt.
British Museum Dimitri Papadimos (Biographical details). Dimitri Papadimos (photographer; Greek; Male; 1918 - 1994),( Durrell's film, 'The Spirit of Place'),(His archive was donated by his wife to the E.L.I.A., the Hellenic Literary and Historical Archive, Athens).
The Photographic Gallery - The American University in Cairo November 1997: “Goura” by Dimitri Papadimos ... his friend, the Egyptian architect Hassan Fathy...
DIMITRI PAPADIMOS - MIET - NATIONAL BANK OF GREECE CULTURAL FOUNDATION Details of the "Dimitri Papadimos" Archive.
ELIA-THE HELLENIC LITERARY AND HISTORICAL ARCHIVE, Dimitris Papadimos: Chronological Chart
ELIA-THE HELLENIC LITERARY AND HISTORICAL ARCHIVE, The "Dimitri Papadimos" Collection/Archive...comprises 80,000 negatives (6x6 cm.) and their corresponding contact prints. It features a wide variety of themes, both of Egypt and Greece...
Greek Newspaper KATHIMERINI "The Greek Photographer Dimitri Papadimos
King's College London School of Arts and Humanities "Greek(Hi)stories through the Lens" (pdf file)

1918 births
1994 deaths
Greek photographers
Photographers from Cairo
Egyptian people of Greek descent
Egyptian expatriates in France
Egyptian emigrants to Greece